was a district located in Ibaraki, Japan.

On November 1, 2004, the town of Jūō was merged into the neighboring and expanding city of Hitachi. Therefore, the Taga District was dissolved as a result of this merger.

As of 2003, the district had an estimated population of 13,373 and a density of 185.43 persons per km2. The total area was 72.12 km2.

Towns and villages
Prior to November 1, 2004, the district included:
 Jūō

Former districts of Ibaraki Prefecture